M. Eugene Durfee (1885-1941) was an American architect prominent in Orange County, California.

Life and career
Morien Eugene Durfee was born in Chippewa Falls, Wisconsin in 1885. In 1897 his family moved to Seattle, Washington, where Durfee was educated. Around 1903, at the age of 18, Durfee went to San Francisco to work for architects Shea & Shea, who were known for their commercial buildings. Three years later he returned to Seattle. In 1909 he formed a partnership in Seattle with Emmanuel J. Bresemann, whom he had known in San Francisco. In late 1913, Durfee took an extended trip to Southern California to visit his wife's family. Interested in the opportunities that it offered, Bresemann & Durfee was dissolved and Durfee moved south to Los Angeles. By early 1914 he was living and practicing in Anaheim.

As an architect, Durfee had a major impact on the physical character of Anaheim, plus the nearby cities of Fullerton and Santa Ana. However, most of downtown Anaheim (and thus Durfee's buildings) was destroyed by urban renewal in the 1980s.

Durfee relocated to Tucson, Arizona in 1921, but returned only a few months later. Other than that, he remained in Anaheim until 1927, when he moved to Los Angeles, with offices in the Commercial Exchange Building. By the time of his death on December 26, 1941, he was working in Long Beach.

Selected works

Bresemann & Durfee, 1909-1913
 1909 - Pemberton Bros. Houses, 4711-4715-4719 Whitman Ave N and 917 N 48th St, Seattle, Washington
 1910 - Nemias B. Beck Houses, 5800-5804 15th Ave, Seattle, Washington
 1910 - Westlake Hotel, 2008 Westlake Ave, Seattle, Washington
 1911 - St. James Hotel, 640 Johnson St, Victoria, British Columbia
 1912 - First Congregational (Central Presbyterian) Church, 1170 Thurlow St, Vancouver, British Columbia
 1913 - Commercial Hotel, 121 Bastion St, Nanaimo, British Columbia
 1913 - First Congregational Church, 1600 Quadra St, Victoria, British Columbia

M. Eugene Durfee, 1914-1941
 1914 - Yungbluth Building, 145 W Center St, Anaheim, California
 Demolished.
 1915 - Hotel Valencia, 182 W Center St, Anaheim, California
 Burned in 1977.
 1916 - First National Bank Building, Center St, Anaheim, California
 Demolished.
 1918 - Grand Theatre, 1139 N G Ave, Douglas, Arizona
 1918 - Liberty Theatre, 110 Jerome Ave, Jerome, Arizona
 Facade altered beyond recognition.
 1922 - Anaheim City Hall, 204 E Center St, Anaheim, California
 With Theodore C. Kistner of San Diego. Demolished.
 1922 - California Hotel (Villa del Sol), 305 N Harbor Blvd, Fullerton, California
 With Frank K. Benchley of Fullerton.
 1923 - Chapman Building, 110 E Wilshire Blvd, Fullerton, California
 1923 - Kraemer Building, 76 S Claudina St, Anaheim, California
 1926 - Pickwick Hotel, 225 S Anaheim Blvd, Anaheim, California
 Demolished in 1988.
 1927 - Amphitheatre, Pearson Park, Anaheim, California
 1927 - Builder’s Exchange Building, 1505 4th St, Santa Monica, California
 1928 - El Cortez Apartments, 475 S New Hampshire Ave, Los Angeles, California
 1929 - Central Tower Building, 1424 4th St, Santa Monica, California
 1929 - Fox Tucson Theatre, 17 W Congress St, Tucson, Arizona
 1930 - Georgian Hotel, 1415 Ocean Ave, Santa Monica, California

References

1885 births
1941 deaths
Architects from California
Architects from Seattle
20th-century American architects